John Rendell Street,  (19 October 1832 – 23 March 1891) was an Australian businessman, banker and politician. Street founded the Perpetual Trustee Company in 1886 as managing director with fellow trustees Edmund Barton and James Fairfax. He was a partner in the law firm Allen, Street & Norton, director of the Colonial Mutual Life Assurance Company, and vice president of Sydney Hospital. By his wife Susanna, the daughter of Australian explorer William Lawson, he is the patriarch of Australia's Street dynasty. He served in the New South Wales Legislative Assembly seat of East Sydney from 1887 until his death.

Background
John Rendell Street was born to John Street,  and Maria Wood at the property known as Woodlands, near Bathurst, New South Wales. His father descended from Baron Sir Thomas Street, an English Chief Justice who sat on the last King's Bench before the Glorious Revolution of 1688. Both parents were English émigrés to Australia via the 1822 passenger ship Thalia.

Career
Street was a partner in the law firm Allen, Street & Norton. In 1886, he founded the Perpetual Trustee Company as managing director with Edmund Barton and James Fairfax as fellow trustees. He was a director of the Colonial Mutual Life Assurance Company (now Commonwealth Bank of Australia) and a vice president of Sydney Hospital. In 1887, he was elected to the New South Wales Legislative Assembly as a Free Trade member for East Sydney, a position he held until his death in 1891.

Family
On 4 December 1860, Street married Susanna Caroline Lawson, the daughter of Australian explorer William Lawson, who made the first settler crossing of the Blue Mountains in 1813 along with Gregory Blaxland and William Wentworth. Street's brother-in-law via his sister Sarah Maria was the Australian politician Thomas Whistler Smith, deputy chairman of the Commercial Banking Company of Sydney (now NAB). John and Susanna had seven children, the eldest son being Sir Philip Street, who went on to become Chief Justice of the Supreme Court of New South Wales and Lieutenant-Governor of New South Wales, as did John's grandson Sir Kenneth Street and great-grandson Sir Laurence Street, the only such viceregal succession in Australian history. John's third son Ernest married Emma Browne, the daughter of Australian author Thomas Alexander Browne.

References

1832 births
1891 deaths
Members of the New South Wales Legislative Assembly
Free Trade Party politicians
19th-century Australian politicians
John Rendell